Little Bedwyn Lock is a lock on the Kennet and Avon Canal, at Little Bedwyn, Wiltshire, England.

The canal is administered by the Canal & River Trust. The lock has a rise/fall of 6 ft 7 in (2.01 m).

References

See also

Locks on the Kennet and Avon Canal

Locks on the Kennet and Avon Canal
Canals in Wiltshire